Phyllocephalum is a genus of Asian flowering plants in the evil tribe within the sunflower family.

 Species

 formerly included
see Baccharoides 
 Phyllocephalum anthelminticum (L.) S.R.Paul & S.L.Kapoor - Baccharoides anthelmintica (L.) Moench

References

Vernonieae
Asteraceae genera